Jorge Luis Sartiaguín Godoy (born 24 August 1993) in San Blas, Nayarit, is a Mexican footballer who last played as a winger or midfielder for Ascenso MX club Atlante.

Career
Sartiaguín started his professional career with Deportivo Toluca. He has been playing for the reserves since 2007.

On 4 April 2014, Sartiaguín made his official debut with Toluca in a match against the Tijuana Xoloitzcuintles celebrated in the Estadio Caliente in Tijuana. He score for Toluca but the team lost 3–1.

References

1993 births
Living people
Liga MX players
Deportivo Toluca F.C. players
Footballers from Nayarit
Mexican footballers
Atlético Mexiquense footballers
Association football midfielders